Haldon Darryl Allan Eastman (born July 6, 1948) is a Canadian television director and executive producer.

Born in Manitoba, Eastman received a Bachelor of Arts degree from the University of Manitoba in 1971. He then studied at the Film School of the University of Bristol where he wrote and directed his first film A Sweeter Song. He directed the feature films The War Boy (1985), Crazy Moon (1986) and Danger Zone (1996).

Eastman was an executive producer for television shows including Night Man, Beastmaster and Gene Roddenberry's Andromeda. He has also directed episodes for TV shows such as The Littlest Hobo, Road to Avonlea, Beachcombers, Friday the 13th: The Series, Danger Bay, Sliders, Night Man, F/X: The Series, Poltergeist: The Legacy, Gene Roddenberry's Earth: Final Conflict, Star Trek: Deep Space Nine, Star Trek: Voyager, Gene Roddenberry's Andromeda and Degrassi: The Next Generation.

Eastman's miniseries Ford: The Man and the Machine was the recipient of three Gemini Awards, including Best Miniseries, and seven other nominations, while Race for the Bomb and Champagne Charlie also earned seven Gemini nominations. Eastman also received a Golden Reel Award, as the director of Ford, and a 2001 Leo Award for Andromeda Best Dramatic Series.

Films
 A Sweeter Song - 1976
 The War Boy - 1985
 Crazy Moon - 1987
 Danger Zone - 1996

Television series
 Night Man
 Beastmaster
 The Littlest Hobo
 Road to Avonlea
 Beachcombers
 Friday the 13th: The Series
 Danger Bay
 Sliders
 Night Man
 F/X: The Series
 Poltergeist: The Legacy
 Gene Roddenberry's Earth: Final Conflict
 Star Trek: Deep Space Nine
 Star Trek: Voyager
 Gene Roddenberry's Andromeda
 Degrassi: The Next Generation
 Stargate SG1: Episode 13
 Champagne Charlie (1989)

References

External links
 

1948 births
Living people
Alumni of the University of Bristol
Canadian television directors
Canadian television producers
Film directors from Manitoba
University of Manitoba alumni